Massimo  is an Italian surname. Notable people with the name include:

 Alessio Di Massimo (born 1996), Italian professional footballer
 Annella di Massimo (1613–1649), Italian painter, active in Naples
 Camillo Massimo (1620–1677), Italian cardinal
 Domenico Massimo (1630 –1685), Roman Catholic prelate
 Emiliano Massimo (born 1989), Italian footballer
 Franco Massimo (born 1968), English former professional footballer 
 Luisa Massimo (1928–2016), Italian pediatrician
 Melina Laboucan-Massimo, advocate for climate justice and Indigenous rights
 Massimiliano Massimo (died 1911), Italian Jesuit
 Roberto Massimo (born 2000), German professional footballer

See also 
 Massimo
 Massimo (disambiguation)